Fabio da Silva Costa Marinho (born 25 March 1983) is a retired Brazilian footballer.

Career statistics

Club

Notes

References

1983 births
Living people
Brazilian footballers
Brazilian expatriate footballers
Association football defenders
Avaí FC players
Clube Atlético Metropolitano players
Coritiba Foot Ball Club players
Associação Naval 1º de Maio players
Esporte Clube São Bento players
ABC Futebol Clube players
Associação Chapecoense de Futebol players
Esporte Clube Noroeste players
Associação Desportiva Confiança players
Free State Stars F.C. players
Guarani de Palhoça players
Hà Nội FC (1956) players
Clube Esportivo Aimoré players
Associação Atlética Coruripe players
South African Premier Division players
Brazilian expatriate sportspeople in South Africa
Expatriate soccer players in South Africa
Expatriate footballers in Syria
União Esporte Clube players
Syrian Premier League players